Trachinus cornutus is a fish of the family Trachinidae, order Perciformes, and class Actinopterygii. Widespread in the southeastern Pacific along the coasts of Chile, it is a marine subtropical demersal fish.

References

 Trachinus cornutus at FishBase

Trachinus
Fish of the Pacific Ocean
Western South American coastal fauna
Fish described in 1848
Endemic fauna of Chile